The 2020 Australian Open wildcard playoffs and entries are a group of events and internal selections to choose the eight men and eight women singles wildcard entries for the 2020 Australian Open, as well as seven male and seven female doubles teams plus eight mixed-doubles teams.

Wildcard entries

Men's singles

Women's singles

Men's doubles

Women's doubles

Mixed doubles

American Wildcard Challenge
The USTA awarded a wildcard to the man and woman that earned the most ranking points across a group of three ATP/Challenger hardcourt events in the October and November 2019. For the men, the events included ATP Paris, Shenzhen, Charlottesville, Playford, Bratislava, Knoxville, Kobe, Houston, Champaign, Helsinki, Ortisei and Pune events. For the women, the events included Macon, Poitiers, Saguenay, Tyler, Toronto, Liuzhou, Nantes, Las Vegas, Shenzhen, Houston, Taipei and Tokyo events. For men, only the best two results from the three weeks of events were taken into account. While for women only the best three results from the four weeks of events were taken into account. Any player who otherwise qualified for the main draw of was excluded from wildcard considerations (as happened, in the case of Marcos Giron).

Men's standings

Women's standings

Asia-Pacific Wildcard Playoff
The Asia-Pacific Australian Open Wildcard Play-off featured 16-players in the men's and women's singles draws and took place from 4 to 8 December 2019 at Hengqin International Tennis Centre in Zhuhai, China.

Men's singles

Seeds

Draw

Women's singles

Seeds

Draw

Men's doubles

Seeds

Draw

Women's doubles

Seeds

Draw

Australian Wildcard Playoff
The December Showdown is held annually for two weeks in December. The Showdown includes age championships for 12/u, 14/u, 16/u and 18/u age categories. It also hosts the 2020 Australian Wildcard Playoff which will be held from 9–15 December 2019 at Melbourne Park, offering a main draw singles wildcard for men and women and a main draw women's doubles wildcard.

Men's singles

Seeds

Draw

Women's singles

Seeds

Draw

Women's doubles

Seeds

Draw

Notes

References

External links 
 Asia/Pacific Wildcard Playoff
 Australian Wildcard Playoff
 USTA Wildcard Challenge